Parliamentary elections were held in Bophuthatswana on 22 October 1987. The Bophuthatswana Democratic Party won 66 of the 72 of the elected seats in the National Assembly.

Electoral system
The National Assembly had a total of 102 seats, 72 of which were elected and 30 of which were appointed.

Results

References

Bophuthatswana
Elections in Bophuthatswana
October 1987 events in Africa